The Williams FW18, also known as the Williams-Renault FW18, is one of the most successful Formula One car designs of all time. It was designed by Adrian Newey and Patrick Head for the Williams F1 team for the 1996 Formula One season.

The FW18s were driven by Damon Hill and Jacques Villeneuve. The car proved to be the most successful of the entire 1996 field; winning 12 of the 16 races during the season, with Hill winning 8 and Villeneuve winning 4. The FW18 was also the car in which Damon Hill won the Drivers' Championship title, making him the first son of a World Champion to become a Champion himself. The FW18 was also the second of three cars during the 1990s to enjoy a 1–2 finish on its Grand Prix debut, the first being the Williams FW14B at the 1992 South African Grand Prix and the third being the McLaren MP4/13 at the 1998 Australian Grand Prix. The FW18 scored 175 points in its time and was one of the most successful Formula One cars of the 1990s.

Design 
Powered by a 3.0 litre Renault V10 engine, the FW18 drew heavily on the 1995 Williams car, the FW17, but featured new driver protection as regulated by the FIA for the new season. The drivers sat lower in the cockpit, which lowered the car's centre of gravity, thus aiding the handling of the car. Newey's aerodynamics placed the car well ahead of the Benetton B196s of Gerhard Berger and Jean Alesi and the Ferrari F310s that Michael Schumacher and Eddie Irvine had at their disposal.

In pre-season testing, Hill covered over 9,000 km refining the new car. It was well balanced and pleasant to drive, responded well to setup changes, and was comfortable to sit in.

Season performance

Williams retained Damon Hill for 1996, who helped to develop the FW18, and the car seemed to respond well to his smooth driving style, while his new teammate, Formula One rookie Jacques Villeneuve, also quickly adapted to the FW18. The car was extremely reliable, as FW18s completed 1778 laps of a possible 2028, more than any other car that season. The car responded well to set-up changes and was competitive on all types of circuits, with at least one Williams driver on the podium for every race, excluding the Monaco and Italian Grands Prix.

The FW18's dominance was also due in part to the recent personnel changes at rival teams. Benetton (running the B196s of Gerhard Berger and Jean Alesi for 1996), which had previously bested Williams in the past two seasons, had lost Michael Schumacher and several key technical people to Ferrari. However, the Ferrari F310s that Schumacher and Eddie Irvine had at their disposal were unreliable and it would not be until 1997 that they could challenge for the Constructors' title.

The FW18 proved to be extremely successful during the season, as the car won twelve of the sixteen races and won the Constructors' Championship for Williams at the Hungarian Grand Prix with four rounds to spare. Their eventual winning margin of 105 points over second placed Ferrari was the second largest recorded in history at the time, behind only the McLaren MP4/4 from 1988.

Hill and Villeneuve fought a good natured but close intra-team title fight, with Hill winning six of the opening nine races to open up a points cushion, which he successfully defended in the second half of the season after Villeneuve began to mount a title challenge, the foundations of which were built upon a run of seven consecutive mid-season podium finishes.  

The Championship title was eventually decided in the Englishman's favour at the final round in Japan after Villeneuve's car lost its right-rear wheel.  This was after Williams team principal, Frank Williams, took the controversial decision to not re-sign Hill for the 1997 season. Also before the season concluded, designer Adrian Newey had been placed on "gardening leave" as he would join McLaren for 1998. The departures of Hill and Newey would signal the beginning of the end of Williams dominance in Formula One, only narrowly winning the Driver's title in 1997, and failing to win a race in 1998; although they remained competitive up until 2004, with Patrick Head at the helm of engineering.

Hill was re-united with the FW18 14 years after his championship year, as he demonstrated the car at the 2010 Bahrain Grand Prix.

Other 

The car appears in the games Formula One Championship Edition and F1 2013 as one of the classic cars in those games. In June 2017, it was announced that the car will reappear in F1 2017 along with the Williams FW14B. In July 2018, it was announced that the car will again reappear as one of the returning classic cars in F1 2018.

Complete Formula One results
(key) (results in bold indicate pole position, results in italics indicate fastest lap)

Footnotes

External links

Williams Formula One cars
1996 Formula One season cars
Formula One championship-winning cars